The 2019 Women's Oceania Handball Challenge Trophy was held in New Caledonia from 11 to 16 August 2019.

The competition participants were defending champions New Zealand, host New Caledonia, regulars Australia and America Samoa. New to the championship were Papua New Guinea, and Fiji.

Hosts New Caledonia were the clear winners over Australia. Third was New Zealand then America Samoa. Fifth was Papua New Guinea ahead of Fiji on goal difference

However, New Caledonia are ineligible for World Championship and consequently, spot for 2020 Women's Junior World Handball Championship is taken by second place Australia.

Results

Rankings

References

 Report Day 1 & 2.International Handball Federation webpage
 Results & Report on International Handball Federation webpage
 All game on You Tube - Nouvelle-Calédonie la 1ère (French)
 Grace Schulz to represent Australia under 18 women's handball team at Oceanic Cup. Redland City Bulletin. 23 July 2019
 American Samoa Handball Team crushes Fiji at U19 Women’s tourney. Samoa News. 15 August 2019
 TAPUA’IA SE PINE FANAU TA’A’ALO HANDBALL I NEW CALEDONIA Samoa News. 15 August 2019 (In Samoan)
 Handballers Natasha Lunnis and Sigrid Dobson shift sights to World Cup. South East News. August 24, 2019
 International Handball Success. Brisbane State High School. 9 August 2019 

Oceania Handball Challenge Trophy
Oceania Handball Challenge Trophy
Women's sports in Oceania